Daniel, Dan, or Danny Taylor may refer to:

Sportspeople
Dan Taylor (shot putter) (born 1982), American shot putter
Dan Taylor (cricketer) (1887–1957), South African cricketer
Dan Taylor (footballer, born 1993), English footballer
Dan Taylor (Australian footballer) (1922–2005), Australian rules footballer
Dan Taylor (rodeo) (1923–2010), rodeo calf-roper
Danny Taylor (footballer) (born 1991), English footballer
Danny Taylor (ice hockey) (born 1986), British ice hockey goaltender
Danny Taylor (baseball) (1900–1972), American baseball player
Danny Taylor (rower), Irish Olympic rower and New Zealand university administrator

Others
Daniel C. Taylor (born 1945), American scholar and practitioner of social change
Daniel Taylor (Baptist pastor) (1738–1816), founder of the New Connexion of General Baptists
Daniel Taylor (countertenor) (born 1969), Canadian countertenor
Daniel Taylor (environmentalist) (born 1938), American nature protection specialist (California, Hawaii)
Daniel Taylor (painter) (born 1955), Canadian painter
Daniel Taylor (politician) (1825–1889), Irish Liberal Member of Parliament for Coleraine 1874–1880
Daniel Taylor (writer) (born 1948), Christian writer and academic
Daniel G. Taylor (1819–1878), mayor of St. Louis, Missouri
Danny Gordon Taylor, visual effects supervisor
Daniel Taylor (actor), English comedy actor
Daniel Taylor (journalist), British football journalist

Fictional characters
Dan Taylor, character in the film American Empire
Captain Dan Taylor, a character in the game The House of the Dead III
Danny Taylor (Without a Trace), a fictional character on the CBS television crime drama
Lieutenant Dan Taylor, a fictional character from the book and film Forrest Gump